Fifth Avenue station is a station of the Orange Line, Blue Line, and Silver Line on the San Diego Trolley. It is located in downtown San Diego, California. The station is located along on C Street, between Sixth Avenue and its namesake Fifth Avenue, surrounded by several office buildings.

It is one of the original stations of the San Diego Trolley, opening on July 26, 1981. At the time of opening, it was called Gaslamp station, due to its proximity to the Gaslamp Quarter. During the development of the Bayside extension, which would include a station much closer to the Gaslamp Quarter, this station was often called Gaslamp North station, while the new station was called Gaslamp South. When the Bayside extension opened in 1990, the new stop was called Gaslamp Quarter station, and this station was renamed Fifth Avenue to avoid confusion.

This station was closed between December 17, 2012 and June 2013 for renovations as part of the Trolley Renewal Project.

Station layout
There are two tracks, each with a side platform. Silver Line heritage service operates Friday through Sunday only.

See also
 List of San Diego Trolley stations

References

Blue Line (San Diego Trolley)
Orange Line (San Diego Trolley)
Silver Line (San Diego Trolley)
Railway stations in the United States opened in 1981
San Diego Trolley stations in San Diego
1981 establishments in California